Voiculescu is a Romanian surname. Notable people with the surname include:

Camelia Voiculescu, businesswoman
Dan Voiculescu (born 1946), politician
Dan-Alexandru Voiculescu (1940–2009), composer and musicologist
Dan-Virgil Voiculescu (born 1949), mathematician
Marioara Voiculescu, actress
, former Mayor of Bucharest
Vasile Voiculescu (1884–1963), writer
Vlad Voiculescu (born 1983), politician
Vlad Voiculescu (physician)

See also 
 Voicu

Romanian-language surnames